Human rights in Botswana are protected under the constitution.  The 2009 Human Rights Report by the United States Department of State noted that in general the government of Botswana has respected the rights of its citizens.

Constitution
The constitution of Botswana addresses human rights principles such as freedom of speech,  Freedom of assembly and the right to life.

Issues

Freedom of speech and press
The constitution addresses the notion of freedom of speech and this is generally respected by the government.

Death penalty

The High Court in Johannesburg, South Africa has described Botswana as a "pariah state not synchronized with the majority of African countries that have either abandoned or are refusing to implement the death penalty". Thirty-two people were hanged in Botswana between independence in 1966 and 1998 and a further six were executed between 2001 and 2006.

Indigenous people

Many of the indigenous San people have been forcibly relocated from their land onto reservations. To make them relocate, they were denied from accessing water from their land and faced arrest if they hunted, which was their primary source of food. Their lands lie in the middle of the world’s richest diamond field. Officially, the government denies that there is any link to mining and claims the relocation is to preserve the wildlife and ecosystem, even though the San people have lived sustainably on the land for millennia. On the reservations, they struggle to find employment and alcoholism is rampant.

Historical situation
The following chart shows Botswana's ratings since 1972 in the Freedom in the World reports, published annually by Freedom House. A rating of 1 is "free"; 7, "not free".

International treaties
Botswana's stances on international human rights treaties are as follows:

See also 
 LGBT rights in Botswana

Notes

References

External links
 Freedom in the World 2012 Report, by Freedom House

 
Botswana
Politics of Botswana